Harriette is a given name. Notable people with the name include:

Harriette Chick (1875–1977), notable British protein scientist and nutritionist
Harriette Cole (born 1961), writer and columnist who works for the New York Daily News
Harriette A. Keyser (1841-1936), American industrial reformer and author
Harriette Deborah Lacy (1807–1874), English actress born in London
Harriette Moore (1902–1952), African-American teacher and civil rights worker
Harriette Newell Woods Baker (1815–1893), prolific American author of books for children
Harriette Simpson Arnow (1908–1986), American novelist, claimed by both Kentucky and Michigan as a native daughter
Harriette Smythies (1813-1883), English novelist and poet
Harriette Tarler (1920–2001), American film actress
Harriette Walters served as a tax assessments manager for the District of Columbia
Harriette Wilson (1786–1845), celebrated British Regency courtesan
Harriette Winslow (born 1950), actress on the show Perfect Strangers and the ABC/CBS series of Family Matters

See also
 Harriet